The National Archives of Cambodia are located in Phnom Penh. The collections include newspapers, magazines, photographs, posters, maps and drawings.

See also 

 List of national archives

References

External links 

 http://nac.gov.kh

Cambodia
Archives in Cambodia